Brian Harold Billick (born February 28, 1954) is an American former football coach and commentator. He was the offensive coordinator for the Minnesota Vikings from 1994 to 1998; the team broke the NFL scoring record in the 1998 season. He then spent nine seasons as head coach of the Baltimore Ravens from January 19, 1999 to December 31, 2007.

On January 28, 2001, Billick won Super Bowl XXXV as the Ravens' head coach in a 34–7 victory over the New York Giants. It was the  Ravens' first Super Bowl appearance. He was inducted into the Baltimore Ravens Ring of Honor in 2019.

Early life

Playing career
Billick, who played football and basketball at Redlands High School in Redlands, California, had his #17 jersey retired by the school in March 2001. On the basketball team, he was teammates with future Major League Baseball player Julio Cruz. He played both quarterback and cornerback and holds the state record with 21 career interceptions.

After spending his freshman season as a linebacker at the United States Air Force Academy, Billick transferred to Brigham Young University  and became a tight end. He later told friends that he left the Air Force Academy because he learned, after he'd already enrolled, that his height and size (6-foot-5, 230 lb.) precluded him from ever becoming a fighter pilot. He received All-Western Athletic Conference and honorable mention All-America honors in 1976.

Billick was selected in the 11th round with the 295th overall pick of the 1977 NFL Draft by the San Francisco 49ers, but was released by both the 49ers and the Dallas Cowboys that year and never played in the NFL.

Coaching career

College

In 1977, after being cut by the 49ers, Billick appeared as a contestant on TV's Match Game PM. He later returned to his hometown of Redlands, California, and served as a volunteer wide receivers coach for the University of Redlands football team (NAIA), under coach Frank Serrao. That season, he also split time as an assistant coach at Redlands High School. Billick said he coached the high school team's practice from 2 to 4 p.m., then headed over to the university for the college practice.

Billick worked as a graduate assistant at Brigham Young for one season (1978) before joining the 49ers as the assistant director of public relations for two years (1979–1980).

He returned to coaching with San Diego State University, serving as the tight ends coach and recruiting coordinator for five seasons (1981–1985) under Doug Scovil. After being named the offensive coordinator of Utah State University, Billick improved the second-worst offense in Division I-A into a top-10 offense in three seasons (1986–1988).

Billick was then hired as the assistant head coach and tight ends coach at Stanford by Dennis Green, serving both roles for three seasons (1989–91).

National Football League

Assistant coach
Billick was hired as an Assistant coach by the Vikings. The Vikings made the playoffs during six of the seven seasons (1992–1998) that Billick spent with the team, and set several offensive records in the process. In 1998, Minnesota set an NFL record for most points scored in a season (556) (which has since been broken by the 2007 Patriots and the 2013 Broncos), and set a team record with 41 touchdown passes. His work under Minnesota head coach Dennis Green put Billick in the Bill Walsh coaching tree.

Head coach
Billick became the second head coach in Baltimore Ravens history on January 20, 1999 when he was appointed to replace Ted Marchibroda. He had an 85–67 record in nine seasons (1999–2007) with the team, including 5–3 in the playoffs. He won a Super Bowl title in Super Bowl XXXV over the New York Giants.

Although Billick had the opportunity to interview for the head coaching job of the reactivated Cleveland Browns and was rumored to be their top candidate, he chose to interview with the Ravens first. He signed with Baltimore in under 24 hours after his initial interview.

In his first season with the Ravens, Billick led the team to its first non-losing record (8–8) in the franchise's four-year history.

The next season, the Ravens finished with a 12–4 record and earned their first playoff berth. Prior to reaching the playoffs, Billick forbade his players from using either the term "playoffs" or the term "Super Bowl," with the idea of keeping them focused on winning each game instead of on a more distant prize. Billick felt this approach would help them reach that goal, and went so far as to fine Tony Siragusa for violating the rule. In response, the players borrowed the term "Festivus" from the television series Seinfeld for the playoffs, and the term Festivus Maximus for the Super Bowl. When they reached the playoffs, Billick lifted this ban. The Ravens took advantage of their vaunted defense, which allowed an NFL record-low 165 points in the regular season (for a point differential of 168; the Ravens also led the league in turnover differential at +23) during the playoffs to advance to Super Bowl XXXV against the New York Giants. It was a blowout 34-7 victory, giving Billick his first and only Super Bowl.

Billick led the Ravens to a 10–6 record and a victory over the Miami Dolphins in a 2001 wild card playoff game before losing to the Pittsburgh Steelers in the Divisional Round. Baltimore finished 7–9 and missed the playoffs in 2002, but bounced back in 2003 with a 10-6 record and the franchise's first division title; the key game of this season was a wild 44–41 overtime win over the Seattle Seahawks in which the Ravens scored 20 unanswered points from the 10:14 mark of the fourth quarter through overtime; the win launched the then 5–5 Ravens into the division title. The Ravens lost to the Titans, 20–17, in the Wild Card Round of the playoffs.

The Ravens missed the playoffs in 2004 with a 9–7 record and in 2005 with a 6–10 record before bouncing back in the 2006 season. Billick fired offensive coordinator Jim Fassel on October 17, 2006, assuming the role for the remainder of the season, as the Ravens earned a franchise best 13–3 record, won the AFC North, and earned the first playoff bye in team history. Baltimore, however, lost to the eventual Super Bowl champion Indianapolis Colts, 15–6, in the divisional round.

Billick was fired on December 31, 2007, one day after the conclusion of a 5–11 season punctuated by a Week 15 22–16 overtime loss to the previously winless Miami Dolphins at Dolphin Stadium on December 16. He was succeeded by John Harbaugh on January 19, 2008.

For his contributions to the organization, including leading them to their first Super Bowl victory, Billick would eventually be inducted into the Baltimore Ravens Ring of Honor on September 29, 2019.

Post-NFL career 
Billick coached the Team Kai squad of college football all-stars in the 2022 Hula Bowl, winning the game, 21–20. He was later hired as an offensive analyst and advisor to the head coach for the Arizona State Sun Devils football program. Billick returned to coach Team Kai in the 2023 Hula Bowl, which his team again won.

Broadcasting career
When the Ravens were eliminated in the playoffs in 2003, Billick was used as a studio analyst by ABC Sports. After being fired by the Ravens, Billick became a draft analyst for the NFL Network during the 2008 NFL Draft.  Billick then became a game analyst for the NFL on Fox during the 2008 NFL season, working alongside Thom Brennaman. Billick related in 2019 an exchange with Jimmy Johnson (also a former champion coach-turned-broadcaster for Fox) that gave Billick perspective on if he wanted to return to coaching (while Billick fully intended to do): "Don’t go back unless it’s in your bones. Too many of us go back. I was one of them. I went back for the wrong reasons. If you go back for ego, if you go back for money, it’s the wrong reason." Billick grew to like the broadcasting job and the increased free time it gave to him. On NFL on Fox, his broadcasting partner for the 2009 NFL season was Brennaman. On NFL Network, Billick appeared alongside Dennis Green on The Coaches Show, as well as Sterling Sharpe and Brian Baldinger on Thursday and Friday editions of Playbook, the ultimate NFL “Xs and Os” program utilizing the same “all 22” game film that coaches and players use to preview upcoming games. He also serves as an analyst on NFL Network's signature show NFL Total Access and has provided on location analysis for the Network's coverage of the NFL Scouting Combine and NFL Draft. He often appeared on ESPN's Mike and Mike in the Morning to discuss football matchups and news. Billick left Fox after the 2013 season.

Personal life
Billick and his wife, Kim have two daughters, Aubrey and Keegan. The family resides in Queenstown, Maryland.

Through his daughter Keegan, Billick is the father-in-law of former NBA player Jon Leuer.

Head coaching record

References

External links
 
 

1954 births
Living people
People from Fairborn, Ohio
People from Redlands, California
Sportspeople from San Bernardino County, California
Players of American football from California
American football tight ends
BYU Cougars football players
Coaches of American football from California
BYU Cougars football coaches
San Diego State Aztecs football coaches
Utah State Aggies football coaches
Stanford Cardinal football coaches
Minnesota Vikings coaches
National Football League offensive coordinators
Baltimore Ravens head coaches
Super Bowl-winning head coaches
National Football League announcers
College football announcers
Contestants on American game shows